In mathematics, a complete manifold (or geodesically complete manifold)  is a (pseudo-) Riemannian manifold for which, starting at any point , you can follow a "straight" line indefinitely along any direction.

Equivalently, consider a maximal geodesic . A manifold is geodesically complete if for any such geodesic , we have that .

Examples and non-examples
Euclidean space , the spheres , and the tori  (with their natural Riemannian metrics) are all complete manifolds.

All compact Riemannian manifolds and all homogeneous manifolds are geodesically complete.  All symmetric spaces are geodesically complete.

Every finite-dimensional path-connected Riemannian manifold which is also a complete metric space (with respect to the Riemannian distance) is geodesically complete. In fact, geodesic completeness and metric completeness are equivalent for these spaces. This is the content of the Hopf–Rinow theorem.

Non-examples 
A simple example of a non-complete manifold is given by the punctured plane  (with its induced metric). Geodesics going to the origin cannot be defined on the entire real line. By the Hopf–Rinow theorem, we can alternatively observe that it is not a complete metric space: any sequence in the plane converging to the origin is a non-converging Cauchy sequence in the punctured plane.

There exist non-geodesically complete compact pseudo-Riemannian (but not Riemannian) manifolds. An example of this is the Clifton–Pohl torus.

In the theory of general relativity, which describes gravity in terms of a pseudo-Riemannian geometry, many important examples of geodesically incomplete spaces arise, e.g. non-rotating uncharged black-holes or cosmologies with a Big Bang. The fact that such incompleteness is fairly generic in general relativity is shown in the Penrose–Hawking singularity theorems.

References

 

Differential geometry
Geodesic (mathematics)
Manifolds
Riemannian geometry